The 2014 Atlantic 10 Conference baseball tournament took place from May 21 through 24.  The top seven regular season finishers of the league's twelve teams met in the double-elimination tournament held at Billiken Sports Center on the campus of the Saint Louis University in St. Louis.   won their first Tournament championship in their first year of membership and earned the conference's automatic bid to the 2014 NCAA Division I baseball tournament.

Seeding and format
The tournament used the same format from 2013, with the top seven finishers from the regular season seeded one through seven.  The top seed received a single bye while remaining seeds played on the first day.

Results

All-Tournament Team
The following players were named to the All-Tournament Team.

Saint Louis's Michael Bozarth, also chosen in 2013, was a second-time selection.

Most Outstanding Player
Luke Willis was named Tournament Most Outstanding Player.  Willis was an outfielder for George Mason.

References

Tournament
Atlantic 10 Conference Baseball Tournament
Atlantic 10 Conference baseball tournament
Atlantic 10 Conference baseball tournament
2010s in St. Louis
College sports tournaments in Missouri
Baseball competitions in St. Louis